Procambarus lagniappe, the Lagniappe crayfish, is a species of crayfish in the family Cambaridae. It is endemic to Alabama and Mississippi, and is listed as Near Threatened on the IUCN Red List.

References

Cambaridae
Crustaceans of the United States
Freshwater crustaceans of North America
Taxonomy articles created by Polbot
Crustaceans described in 1968